The Horincea is a right tributary of the river Prut in Romania. It flows into the Prut in Rogojeni.

References

Rivers of Romania
Rivers of Galați County
Rivers of Vaslui County
Tributaries of the Prut